Wonder is a 2017 American coming-of-age drama film directed by Stephen Chbosky and written by Jack Thorne, Steven Conrad, and Chbosky. It is based on the 2012 novel of the same name by R. J. Palacio and stars Julia Roberts, Owen Wilson, Jacob Tremblay, Noah Jupe, Izabela Vidovic, Bryce Gheisar, and Daveed Diggs.

The film, which follows a boy named August Pullman with Treacher Collins syndrome trying to fit in, was released in the United States on November 17, 2017, by Lionsgate. It received positive reviews from critics and audiences, with many praising Tremblay and Roberts' performances, Chbosky's direction, writing, musical score and faithfulness to Palacio's novel; the film was a box office success, grossing $306 million worldwide on a $20 million budget. At the 90th Academy Awards, the film was nominated for Best Makeup and Hairstyling. A spin-off sequel film, White Bird: A Wonder Story, will release in 2023, with Gheisar reprising his role.

Plot
August "Auggie" Pullman is a 10-year-old boy living in a brownstone in Brooklyn with his mother Isabel, father Nate, older sister Olivia ("Via"), and dog Daisy. He was born with the rare medical facial deformity "mandibulofacial dysostosis", and has undergone 27 different surgeries in order to help him see, smell, speak, and hear. 

Auggie has been home-schooled, but as he approaches fifth grade, his parents decide to enroll him in Beecher Prep private middle school. When school starts, Auggie is ostracized, but soon forms a close friendship with his classmate, Jack Will.

For Halloween, Auggie dresses in a Ghostface mask and cloak from last year when Daisy accidentally ruins the Boba Fett costume he was planning to wear. Auggie walks through school upbeat and confident due to the anonymity his costume affords him. However, as he enters his homeroom, he overhears Jack, who fails to recognize him, joining Julian Albens and his friends, who ostracizes Auggie, in making fun of him behind his back, saying "he would kill himself if he looked like Auggie." Becoming distraught and ill, his mother abandons her mother-daughter day with Via to bring Auggie home. Though she is hurt, Via convinces him to go trick-or-treating with her, as she has been rejected by her best friend Miranda.

Auggie forms a new friendship with a girl named Summer, confiding in her about his split with Jack. When Jack asks Summer why Auggie is avoiding him, she only gives Jack the clue "Ghostface". In science class, realization dawns on Jack, and he resolves to partner with Auggie instead of Julian for the science fair. When Julian confronts Jack in the hallway and calls Auggie a "freak", they begin fighting, which is broken up by Mr. Browne and another teacher. After suspending Jack for two days, Mr. Tushman reads Jack's letter about defending Auggie. Jack apologizes to Auggie by Minecraft and they reconcile.

Meanwhile, Via, even though she loves her family, has been feeling neglected that her parents tend to spend more time looking after Auggie since Auggie was born. She signs up for Drama Club after meeting a theater student named Justin, with whom she soon begins a romantic relationship. She is selected as Miranda's understudy for the lead role in the school's production of Our Town, but on opening night, when Justin tells Miranda that Via's family is in attendance after she tells him that her family is not, Miranda feigns illness to let Via take her place. Via gives a moving performance that earns her a loud roar of excitement from the crowd. She and Miranda reconcile. 

Auggie's popularity and circle of friends grow bigger over time, but he continues to be harassed by Julian and his friends until Mr. Browne notices. Mr. Tushman later confronts Julian and his parents with the evidence, including hate notes and a class picture with Auggie photoshopped out. Julian's mother admits that she edited Auggie out of the picture and defends her son’s actions, asserting that the students should not be exposed to Auggie. Despite her threats to pull their funding from the school, Mr. Tushman suspends Julian for two days, causing him to miss an upcoming nature retreat. As they leave, Julian becomes distraught when his parents pull him out of the school, declaring he will not be back in the fall. Julian apologizes to Mr. Tushman, who accepts.

At the nature retreat, Auggie and Jack are ambushed by a trio of seventh graders from another school, but Julian's friends rally and defend them. Auggie becomes more accepted by his classmates afterward. At the year-end graduation ceremony, Auggie thanks his mother for taking him to school. She tells him "you really are a wonder, Auggie." He is given the Henry Ward Beecher Medal for his strength and courage and receives a loud thunderous roar from the crowd. As the movie ends with the crowd shouting wildly for Auggie, he finishes the story by delivering a voiceover narration telling the viewers, and quoting the last precept Mr. Browne gave in class, "Be kind, for everyone is fighting a hard battle. And if you really want to see what people are, all you have to do is look."

Cast
 Jacob Tremblay as August "Auggie" Pullman, a boy with a rare facial deformity.
 Noah Jupe as Jack Will, Auggie's best friend
Julia Roberts as Isabel Pullman, Auggie's mother
 Owen Wilson as Nate Pullman, Auggie's father
 Izabela Vidovic as Olivia "Via" Pullman, Auggie's older sister
 Maccie Margaret Chbosky as young Via
 Mandy Patinkin as Mr. Lawrence Tushman
 Daveed Diggs as Mr. Thomas Browne
 Sônia Braga as Grans
 Danielle Rose Russell as Miranda Navas, Via's best friend
 Nadji Jeter as Justin Hollander, Via's boyfriend
 Bryce Gheisar as Julian Albans, Auggie's classmate and adversary. 
 Millie Davis as Summer Dawson
 Elle McKinnon as Charlotte Cody
 Nicole Oliver as Amanda Will
 Crystal Lowe as Melissa Albans, Julian's mother
 Steve Bacic as Richard Albans, Julian's father
 Ali Liebert as Ms. Petosa

Production

Development
On November 27, 2012, it was announced that Lionsgate was developing a feature film adaptation of R. J. Palacio's debut novel Wonder, and were in talks with John August to write the screenplay. Mandeville Films' David Hoberman and Todd Lieberman produced the film.

On May 8, 2013, Jack Thorne was hired to adapt the novel after August had departed from the project. In October 2014, John Krokidas was reported to be directing the film, though in April 2015, Paul King was hired to direct instead. Steven Conrad was writing the script at that time.

Casting
On April 14, 2016, Jacob Tremblay was cast to play the lead role, Auggie Pullman, while Julia Roberts was in talks to play Auggie's mother. On May 5, 2016, Roberts' casting was confirmed, and Stephen Chbosky was set as the film's director.

On June 27, 2016, Owen Wilson joined to play Auggie's father. On July 11, 2016, newcomer Noah Jupe joined the cast as Auggie's best friend at school, and on July 15, 2016, Daveed Diggs was cast as Mr. Browne, an English teacher at the school.

On August 19, 2016, Sônia Braga joined the cast, portraying the role of Roberts's character's mother.

Special effects
Tremblay's prosthetic makeup, designed and created by Arjen Tuiten, took an hour and a half to apply. It consisted of a skull cap with prosthetic ears attached, a facial prosthetic that covered Tremblay's face, and a wig to tie it all together.

Filming
Filming took place in several locations in British Columbia, Canada, and Coney Island, New York, from October 18 to December 13, 2016.

Music
Marcelo Zarvos composed the film's score.
Bea Miller composed a song for the film, "Brand New Eyes". It was released on August 3, 2017.
Wonder author R. J. Palacio has often credited Natalie Merchant's song "Wonder", from her 1995 album Tigerlily, as the inspiration for her best-selling book.  At Merchant's invitation, the song was featured on the soundtrack. The song is played during the film's end credits.

Release
Lionsgate had initially scheduled Wonder to be released in the United States on April 7, 2017. On February 13, 2017, it was announced that the release date had been pushed back to November 17, 2017. Wonder had its world premiere at the Regency Village Theater in Los Angeles on November 14, 2017.

Reception

Box office
Wonder grossed $132 million in the United States and Canada, and $173 million in other territories, for a worldwide total of $306 million, against a production budget of $20 million. Deadline Hollywood calculated the film made a net profit of $55.3 million, when factoring together all expenses and revenues.

In the United States and Canada, Wonder opened alongside Justice League, The Star, and Roman J. Israel, Esq. and was initially projected to gross around $9 million from 3,096 theaters in its first weekend. However, after grossing $740,000 from Thursday night previews and receiving a large number of group ticket sales, weekend projections were upped to $15 million. Weekend projections were again increased, this time to $28 million, after the film made $9.4 million on its first day. The film went on to debut to $27.1 million, finishing second at the box office, behind Justice League. In its second weekend, the film dropped just 17.7%, grossing $22.7 million and finishing third at the box office.

Critical response
On review aggregator Rotten Tomatoes, the film has an approval rating of 85% based on 190 reviews, and an average rating of 7.1/10. The site's critical consensus reads, "Wonder doesn't shy away from its bestselling source material's sentiment, but this well-acted and overall winsome drama earns its tugs at the heartstrings." On Metacritic, the film has a weighted average score of 66 out of 100, based on 33 critics, indicating "generally favorable reviews". Audiences polled by CinemaScore gave the film an average grade of "A+" on an A+ to F scale, one of fewer than 90 films in the history of the service to receive the grade.

Some reviewers criticized the decision to cast an actor without the same condition as Auggie as undermining the film's message. In August 2021, during Edinburgh TV Festival's MacTaggart Lecture, co-writer Jack Thorne, while not specifically citing Wonder, acknowledged that he had failed to stand up for disabled talent on projects involving the subject, and sought to rectify this through pushing for new disability initiatives like 'Underlying Health Condition', which launched in December 2021.

Accolades 
{| class="wikitable sortable plainrowheaders" style="width: 99%;"
|-
! scope="col" | Award
! scope="col" | Date of ceremony
! scope="col" | Category
! scope="col" | Recipients
! scope="col" | Result
! scope="col" class="unsortable" | 
|-
! scope="row" rowspan="2"| AARP's Movies for Grownups Awards
| rowspan="2"| February 5, 2018
| Best Intergenerational Film
| Wonder
| 
| rowspan="2" style="text-align:center;"| 
|-
| Readers' Choice Poll 
| Wonder
| 
|-
! scope="row" | Academy Awards
| March 4, 2018
| Best Makeup and Hairstyling
| Arjen Tuiten
| 
| style="text-align:center;"| 
|-
! scope="row" | British Academy Film Awards
| February 18, 2018
| Best Makeup and Hair
| Naomi Bakstad, Robert Pandini and Arjen Tuiten
| 
| style="text-align:center;"| 
|-
! scope="row" | Casting Society of America
| January 18, 2018
| Big Budget – Comedy
| Deborah Aquila, Kara Eide, Tricia Wood and Kris Woz
| 
| style="text-align:center;"| 
|-
! scope="row" rowspan="3"| Critics' Choice Movie Awards
| rowspan="3"| January 11, 2018
| Best Young Actor/Actress
| Jacob Tremblay
| 
| rowspan="3" style="text-align:center;"| 
|-
| Best Adapted Screenplay
| Jack Thorne, Steve Conrad and Stephen Chbosky
| 
|-
| Best Hair & Makeup
| Wonder
| 
|-
! scope="row" | Heartland Film Festival
| December 31, 2017
| Truly Moving Picture Award
| Stephen Chbosky
| 
| style="text-align:center;"| 
|-
! scope="row" | Hochi Film Award
| December 18, 2018
| Best International Picture
| Stephen Chbosky
| 
| style="text-align:center;"| 
|-
! scope="row" | London Film Critics Circle
| January 28, 2018
| Young British/Irish Performer of the Year
| Noah Jupe
| 
| style="text-align:center;"| 
|-
! scope="row" rowspan="5"| Make-Up Artists and Hair Stylists Guild
| rowspan="5"| February 24, 2018
| Feature Motion Picture: Best Contemporary Makeup
| Naomi Bakstad, Jean Black and Megan Harkness
| 
| rowspan="5" style="text-align:center;"| 
|-
| Feature Motion Picture: Best Contemporary Hair Styling
| Robert Pandini and Alisa Macmillan
| 
|-
| Feature Motion Picture: Best Special Makeup Effects
| Michael Nickiforek and Arjen Tuiten
| 
|-
| Feature Motion Picture: Best Contemporary Hair Styling
| Robert Pandini and Alisa Macmillan
| 
|-
| Feature Motion Picture: Best Special Makeup Effects
| Michael Nickiforek and Arjen Tuiten
| 
|-
! scope="row" rowspan="3"| Saturn Awards
| rowspan="3"| June 27, 2018
| Best Performance by a Younger Actor
| Jacob Tremblay
| 
| rowspan="3" style="text-align:center;"| 
|-
| Best Make-up
| Arjen Tuiten
| 
|-
| Best Independent Film
| Wonder
| 
|-
! scope="row" | Seattle Film Critics Society
| December 18, 2017
| Best Youth Performance
| Jacob Tremblay
| 
| style="text-align:center;"| <ref>{{cite web|url=http://seattlefilmcritics.com/2017/12/11/blade-runner-2049-leads-the-2017-seattle-film-critics-society-nominations/|title='Blade Runner 2049 Leads the 2017 Seattle Film Critics Society Nominations|work=Seattle Film Critics Society|date=11 December 2017 |access-date=December 13, 2017}}</ref>
|-
! scope="row" | Washington D.C. Area Film Critics Association
| December 8, 2017
| Best Youth Performance
| Jacob Tremblay
| 
| style="text-align:center;"| 
|-
! scope="row" | Women Film Critics Circle
| December 17, 2017
| Best Family Film
| Wonder| 
| style="text-align:center;"| 
|-
! scope="row" rowspan="3"| Teen Choice Awards
| rowspan="3"| August 12, 2018
| Choice Drama
| Wonder| 
| rowspan="3" style="text-align:center;"|
|-
| Choice Drama Actor
| Jacob Tremblay
| 
|-
| Choice Drama Actress
| Julia Roberts
| 
|}

Follow-ups
Sequel/prequel filmWhite Bird: A Wonder Story, a spin-off sequel/prequel war drama film to Wonder based on R. J. Palacio's graphic novel of the same name, starring Gillian Anderson and Helen Mirren, with Bryce Gheisar reprising his role as Julian Albans, began production in February 2021 in the Czech Republic. Described as a "companion piece" to the original film, the film follows Julian as his Parisian grandmother tells him stories of her childhood as a young Jewish girl living in Nazi-occupied France during World War II, when she was hidden from the Nazis by a classmate and his family. Initially scheduled to be released on September 16, 2022, the film's release date was ultimately delayed to October 14, 2022 before the film was removed from the release schedule in September.

Musical adaptation
It was announced on April 9, 2019 that a musical adaptation of the film is in the works for Broadway. Jill Furman (Hamilton'') will produce, R. J. Palacio will adapt the novel for the stage production.

References

External links

 
 
 
 
 
 

American coming-of-age comedy-drama films
2010s coming-of-age comedy-drama films
Films about bullying
Films about disability in the United States
Films directed by Stephen Chbosky
Films scored by Marcelo Zarvos
Films based on American novels
Films based on children's books
Lionsgate films
Mandeville Films films
Participant (company) films
Films with screenplays by Stephen Chbosky
Walden Media films
Films shot in Vancouver
Films set in Brooklyn
Films set in Manhattan
Films set in Pennsylvania
Films with screenplays by Jack Thorne
American children's drama films
Films produced by David Hoberman
Films produced by Todd Lieberman
2010s English-language films
2010s American films